Acleris quercinana is a species of moth of the family Tortricidae. It was described by Zeller in 1849. It is found in most of Europe (except Ireland, Great Britain, Norway, Finland, the Baltic region, Croatia and Slovakia), Asia Minor and Iran.

Adults have been recorded on wing from June to August.

The larvae feed on Quercus species. Larvae can be found from May to June.

References

quercinana
Moths of Asia
Moths of Europe
Taxa named by Philipp Christoph Zeller
Moths described in 1849